John "Jack" Passarella is an American author. His work includes a number of novels set in Joss Whedon's Buffyverse.

Bibliography

Buffyverse
Media tie-in novels relating to the fictional universe established by Buffy and Angel:

 2000 Ghoul Trouble
 2001 Avatar
 2004 Monolith

Supernatural

Media tie-in novels relating to the fictional universe established by Supernatural.

 2011 Night Terror
 2012 Rite of Passage
 2016 Cold Fire

Other works
 1999 Wither (hardcover)
 2000 Wither (paperback)
 2003 Wither's Rain
 2004 Wither's Legacy
 2006 Kindred Spirit
 2009 Shimmer
 2018 Halloween: The Official Movie Novelization

Biography

Passarella is a married father of three young children, who all reside in Logan Township, New Jersey. Currently, "Jack" writes full-time when he's not working on his website design and author promotion business AuthorPromo.com. While he enjoys writing in the genres of dark fantasy, supernatural thrillers, horror, science fiction, fantasy and mystery, he has been concentrating on horror and supernatural stories in recent years.

Wither, co-authored with Joseph Gangemi, was his first published novel. Columbia Pictures purchased the film rights to Wither in a preemptive, pre-publication bid. In 2000, Wither won the Bram Stoker Award for Superior Achievement in a First Novel. 
Passarella followed Wither with the media tie-ins Buffy the Vampire Slayer: Ghoul Trouble and Angel: Avatar. Next came his stand-alone sequel to Wither, Wither's Rain.

The author had two novels published in 2004, Angel: Monolith and Wither's Legacy. Next up is Kindred Spirit in June 2006.

Passarella is an active member of the Horror Writers Association and the Science Fiction and Fantasy Writers of America, a regular member of the Authors Guild, and a member of the Garden State Horror Writers.

Since June 1996, he has been writing articles on Microsoft Word and other soft & hard areas of the computer world for WindoWatch, a free webzine.

A former Treasurer of the Horror Writers Association, and a current mentor, he is also the webmaster for the Garden State Horror Writers.

External links
 John Passarella -- Official Author Site

Living people
20th-century American novelists
21st-century American novelists
American male novelists
20th-century American male writers
21st-century American male writers
Year of birth missing (living people)